The Society of Anthropology of Paris is a French learned society for anthropology founded by Paul Broca in 1859. Broca served as the Secrétaire-général of SAP, and in that capacity responded to a letter from James Hunt welcoming the news that Hunt had established the Anthropological Society of London.

Notable members 

 Leopoldo Batres
 Paul Bert
 Pruner Bey
 Adolphe Bloch
 Paul Broca
 Louis-Adolphe Bertillon
 Anténor Firmin
 Louis Pierre Gratiolet
 Abel Hovelacque
 Pierre Huard, professor of medicine, rector of the Université Félix Houphouët-Boigny from 1964 to 1966
 Gustave Lagneau
 Pyotr Lavrov (1823–1900, Russian philosopher)
 Gustave Le Bon (member from 1879 to 1888)
 Charles Letourneau, general secretary from 1887 to 1902.
 Léonce Manouvrier
 Charles Martin Ploix, president in 1880.
 Clémence Royer
 André Sanson
 Paul Topinard
 Joseph Deniker

References

External links
  (In French)

Learned societies of France
Anthropology organizations
1859 establishments in France